Kristina Stykos is an American record producer, audio engineer, songwriter and performer based in Vermont. Her recording studio, Pepperbox Studio, is solar, wind and generator powered and fully off-the-grid.

Debut
Her first self-produced release, In The Earth's Fading Light (2005), was designated “Best Vermont Album of the Year” by the Barre Montpelier Times Argus. Stykos completed her audio engineering education by earning a production certificate at the Berklee School of Music in Boston.

She has engineered and produced over 15 albums for herself and clients, many of those released on her own indie label: Thunder Ridge Records.

Stykos's solo album Wyoming Territory (2013), was supported by the Ucross Foundation and Brush Creek artist residencies of Wyoming.

Recent works
Her recent albums include two collaborative projects, Beautiful Blood (2013) with singer-songwriter Steve Mayone of Boston, and Raven (2011) co-produced with the Grammy-nominated pianist Philip Aaberg of Montana.

"This certainly is not the voice of a bubblegum pop chanteuse. Stykos now delivers strong songs, with a mature, seemingly all-knowing vocal style." - Art Edelstein, arts reviewer, Barre Montpelier Times Argus

References

External links 
 Kristina Stykos With Philip Aaberg, Raven
 Kristina Stykos, The Lost Tapes 1982-1992
 Kristina Stykos, Wyoming Territory

Year of birth missing (living people)
Place of birth missing (living people)
Living people
American audio engineers
American women songwriters
American record producers
Women audio engineers
21st-century American women